Don Carlos Crespo y Gil-Delgado, Martín-Romero y Piñeda (1 June 1911 – 8 November 1963) was a Spanish aristocrat, son of Alfonso Isabel Crespo y Martín-Romero, 6th Count of Castillo Fiel, and wife dona Isabel Gil-Delgado y Piñeda. 

He was 7th Conde de Castillo Fiel with a Coat of Arms of de Tudó. He married María Teresa Tricio y Echeguren. He was succeeded by his first cousin, Eduardo Crespo y García-Castrillón, 8th Count of Castillo Fiel (8 November 1963).

Sources

1911 births
1963 deaths
Carlos 07
Year of death unknown